Alexander Pagenstecher may refer to:
 Alexander Pagenstecher (ophthalmologist)
 Alexander Pagenstecher (zoologist)